Flemming Meyer is a Danish lightweight rower. He won a gold medal at the 1992 World Rowing Championships in Montreal with the lightweight men's eight.

References

Year of birth missing (living people)
Danish male rowers
World Rowing Championships medalists for Denmark
Living people